Cheryl Lyndsey (born May 7, 1978) is an American singer–songwriter and musician best known as touring member of alternative rock band The Breeders. She is noted as guitarist for Exene Cervenka's solo band and contributed to Exene's 2011 album The Excitement of Maybe. She was declared "One of LA's Best" by LA Weekly. She currently hosts a podcast titled Livin with Me.

Musical career
Cheryl Lyndsey currently fronts Los Angeles rock band the Carrions as guitarist and singer. Their debut album A New Level of Neon (2012) was recorded by Steve Kille of Dead Meadow and mastered by Howie Weinberg (Nirvana's Nevermind) and is distributed by Kille's label Xemu Records. Lyndsey was the drummer of Los Angeles-based rock band HALT, a band formed with Skeleteen co-founder Kyle DiFulvio and fellow Carrions member Michèle Lane.

Lyndsey is most noted for her work as touring guitarist, keyboardist, and backing vocalist for Kim Deal's band the Breeders. She toured with the Breeders in support of their Mountain Battles album and Fate to Fatal EP. Deal reported that the band found Lyndsey through a Craigslist ad.

Lyndsey also served as touring acoustic guitarist for Exene Cervenka's solo band, and contributed to a track on Exene's album The Excitement of Maybe.

She began her music career in the mid-1990s in Orlando, Florida as bassist and backing vocalist in glam punk band Dirty Barby and as drummer and co-vocalist in hard rock band Skeleteen.

Personal life
Lyndsey hosts the podcast Livin with Me"

Discography
With The Carrions:
 A New Level of Neon (2012, Xemu Records)

With Exene Cervenka:
 The Excitement of Maybe (2011, Bloodshot Records)

With Skeleteen:
 Sorry for Everything'' (2003, DB Records)

References

 Breeders Digest

External links
 The Breeders website
 The Carrions website
 HALT website

Living people
1978 births
American women drummers
American women singer-songwriters
American rock singers
American rock bass guitarists
American rock drummers
American indie rock musicians
Women bass guitarists
Singer-songwriters from Florida
Singer-songwriters from California
Guitarists from California
Guitarists from Florida
20th-century American drummers
American women podcasters
American podcasters
20th-century American women musicians
21st-century American singers
21st-century American women singers
21st-century American drummers
21st-century American bass guitarists